Georges-André Chevallaz (7 February 1915 – 8 September 2002) was a Swiss historian, politician and member of the Swiss Federal Council (1974–1983).

Mayor of Lausanne since 1957 and member of the Swiss National Council since 1958, he was elected to the Swiss Federal Council on 5 December 1973 and handed over office on 31 December 1983. He was affiliated to the Free Democratic Party. During his office time he held the following departments:
 Federal Department of Finance (1974–1979)
 Federal Military Department (1980–1983)

He was President of the Confederation in 1980.

After retiring from the Federal Council, he presided the foundation of the Historical Dictionary of Switzerland (1988–1992).

References

Works
Aspects de l'agriculture vaudoise à la fin de l'Ancien Régime: La terre, le blé, les charges; F. Rouge, Lausanne; (1949) -- thesis
 The challenge of neutrality: Diplomacy and the defense of Switzerland; Lexington books, Lanham (translated from Le défi de la neutralité, 2001) 
Histoire générale, de 1789 à nos jours; Payot, Lausanne (1st ed., 1957)

External links

1915 births
2002 deaths
Members of the Federal Council (Switzerland)
Finance ministers of Switzerland
Members of the National Council (Switzerland)
Mayors of Lausanne
Swiss male writers
University of Lausanne alumni
20th-century Swiss historians
20th-century male writers